Popovac is a village and municipality in Osijek-Baranja County, Croatia. There are 2,084 inhabitants in the municipality (2011 census). Popovac is underdeveloped municipality which is statistically classified as the First Category Area of Special State Concern by the Government of Croatia.

Until the end of World War II, the majority of the Inhabitants was Danube Swabians, also called locally as Stifolder, because there Ancestors once came at the 17th century and 18th century from Fulda (district). Mostly of the former German Settlers was expelled to Allied-occupied Germany and Allied-occupied Austria in 1945-1948, about the Potsdam Agreement.

Name

Its name derived from the Slavic word "pop" ("priest" in English). In Hungarian, the village is known as Baranyabán.

Demographics

As of 2011, ethnic groups in the municipality are:
71.40% Croats 
17.03% Serbs 
3.89% Hungarians
1.54% Romani
1.39% Slovenians

Before World War II, almost 70% of the population of Popovac was made up of Danube Swabians. In November 1944, virtually the entire German population of the village was evacuated. They settled permanently in Göppingen.

Geography

Popovac is situated between border with Hungary in the north-west, municipality of Draž in the north-east, municipality of Kneževi Vinogradi in the south-east, and municipality of Beli Manastir in the south-west.

The municipality of Popovac includes the following settlements:
Popovac (pop. 959)
Branjina (pop. 322)
Kneževo (pop. 803)

History

The oldest known name of this place was "Antianae", which dating from the time of the Romans. In the 6th century, this area was settled by Slavs, who founded a village named "Ban".

Other

There is an elementary school in Popovac with 169 students and teaching staff of 23.

See also 
 Church of the Presentation of Mary, Popovac
 Osijek-Baranja County
 Baranja

References

External links

Municipalities of Croatia
Populated places in Osijek-Baranja County